Evi Allemann (born 16 July 1978 in Bern; originally from Welschenrohr) is a Swiss politician of the Social Democratic Party.

Career
In April 1998, Allemann was elected to the Grand Council of Bern and was the youngest female member ever elected in a Swiss Cantonal Council. As a member of the Justice Committee, she mainly focused on schooling and youth policy.

In 2003, she was elected to the National Council with 56,118 votes after she led a campaign alongside her Young Socialists running mates Mirjam Minder, Patric Bhend and Nasha Gagnebin. At the age of 25, she became the youngest member of the 47th Swiss Parliament. She first sat in the Legal Affairs Committees, then in the Transports and Telecommunications Committees and then in the Security Policy Committees.

Even though her party lost votes at the 2007 federal election, Allemann was re-elected with 85,332 votes. She continued seating in the Transports and Telecommunications Committees and the Security Policy Committee.

Allemann lives in Bern and works as a lawyer.

She was elected as the chairwoman of the VCS Verkehrs-Club der Schweiz on 20 April 2013.

On 25 March 2018 she was elected to the Executive Council of Bern with 99,902 votes and took the direction of Justice, Communal Affairs and Church Affairs.

See also
List of members of the National Council of Switzerland, 2003–07
List of members of the National Council of Switzerland, 2007–11
List of members of the National Council of Switzerland, 2011–15
List of members of the Federal Assembly from the Canton of Bern

References

External links

Evi Allemann on the website of the Grand Council of Bern 
Evi Allemann on the website of the canton of Bern
 Evi Allemann's official website 

20th-century Swiss women politicians
20th-century Swiss politicians
21st-century Swiss women politicians
21st-century Swiss politicians
Social Democratic Party of Switzerland politicians
Women members of the National Council (Switzerland)
Members of the National Council (Switzerland)
People from Bern
People from the canton of Solothurn
1978 births
Living people